Magnicourt-sur-Canche (literally Magnicourt on Canche) is a commune in the Pas-de-Calais department in the Hauts-de-France region of France.

Geography

Population

Places of interest
 The church of St.Vaast, dating from the eighteenth century.
 The seventeenth century manor house,

See also
Communes of the Pas-de-Calais department

References

Magnicourtsurcanche